María Teresa Rosaura Ochoa Mejía (born 14 October 1954) is a Mexican politician from the Citizens' Movement. From 2009 to 2012 she served as Deputy of the LXI Legislature of the Mexican Congress representing the State of Mexico.

References

1954 births
Living people
Politicians from the State of Mexico
Women members of the Chamber of Deputies (Mexico)
Members of the Chamber of Deputies (Mexico) for the State of Mexico
Deputies of the LXI Legislature of Mexico
21st-century Mexican politicians
21st-century Mexican women politicians
Deputies of the LXV Legislature of Mexico